The Brooklyn-based band Company consists of three songwriters and a dynamic drummer. They perform folk- and country-based songs with punk and psychedelic rock energy to create a sound that defies ready categories.

Company’s members met at Bard College, where they collaborated in a variety of punk groups and folk ensembles. After moving to Brooklyn, they formed the band in 2001 as a way of weaving together these distinct musical threads, reworking their acoustically conceived songs and adding improvisational elements and post-punk dynamics to the mix. The resulting songs range from punk-country ballads to intimate folkish mediations to psychedelic epics, but the lyric always remains the focus; the vocal commands the foreground while lush harmonies, psych-inflected guitars, and David Janik's powerful rhythms, drive it forward.

Years of modest but consistent shows in small venues like the now-defunct Nine-C Lounge in Manhattan's East Village  and the intimate Pete's Candy Store in Williamsburg, Brooklyn, earned Company a small but loyal following. In this early period, they recorded two studio albums, which remain unreleased, as well as a live album captured at an early Nine-C show. In 2004, they self-released their third record, Hills (recorded by former Oakley Hall drummer Will Dyar). Next, they recorded their fourth, Parallel Time, at the rural Kentucky studio of Paul Oldham, and Oneida's  Brah Records picked it up for release in October 2005. Their second CD on Brah, Old Baby, released in February 2008, was produced by Kid Millions of Oneida. In the 2000s, Company could often be found sharing a billing with their label-mates Oakley Hall (another Nine-C alumnus), Oneida, Home, and Dirty Faces.

In 2014, a single from their self-released album Over the Mountain entitled "Poisonous Spider" was used in TV show The Vampire Diaries in the episode "No Exit," which aired on February 27, 2014. Company went on to release its first LP on its own Papasan Recordings in August 2014.

Members
Adam Davison- guitar, bass, vocals, keyboards
David Janik- drums, percussion, vocals
Stephanie Rabins- bass, guitar, vocals, violin 
Christopher Teret- guitar, bass, vocals, harmonica, keyboards

Discography

Studio albums
 Company aka Jingle Jangle in the Jukebox (recorded in 2002 - unreleased)
 Hills (recorded in 2002 -  self-released in 2004)
 Hadley (recorded in 2003 - unreleased)
 Parallel Time (recorded in 2004 - released in 2005 on Brah Records)
 Old Baby (recorded in 2006 - released in 2008 on Brah Records)
 Ice Age: Outtakes and Demos (recorded 2004-2007 – released as promo download with Old Baby in 2008)
 Night Ground (recorded in 2008 - released in 2010 on Peapod Recordings)
 Jazz Hall of Fame (recorded in 2009 - unreleased)
 Over the Mountain (recorded in 2010 - released in 2014 on Papasan Recordings)

Live albums
 Live at Nine-C (Self-released - 2001)

Singles
 Rude / Angelina (recorded in 2002 - unreleased)
 Poisonous Spider (recorded in 2010 - released in 2014 on Papasan Recordings)

Solo albums
 Chris and Stephanie Predicted the Whole Civil War (released in 2001 on Mountain Collective) 
 Christopher Teret's solo records: Bushwick Spring, Fight Like Hell, Privacy, Enjoy Yourself, Little Guys (with his brother Walker)
 Adam Davison's solo records: as AJ Green: Cemetery Days, On the Wires, Mighty Old Night, and Sleep; as Adam Davison: Borrowed Blues (a covers album), Natural Love (an EP), Sweet Pilgrim (an EP released in 2011 on Papasan Recordings), and Diamond Heart (released in 2012 on Papasan Recordings)

Collaborations
 Adam and Stephanie can be heard on several Oneida records
 David and Adam have collaborated with Andrew Deutsch (Home) on his ongoing improvisational recording project Hold Me 
 Stephanie has been involved in the bands Oakley Hall, Death Vessel, and Nurse and Soldier, among others
 Christopher has recorded and performed with Chriss Sutherland as the duo Snaex in Portland, ME

External links
Company's website
Company on SoundCloud
Company at MySpace
Company page on Brah Records
Company page on Jagjaguwar site

Musical groups from New York (state)
Jagjaguwar artists